Oi Panihi is a village in Tambora district, Bima regency in the West Nusa Tenggara province of Indonesia. Its population in 2010 was 475.

Climate
Oi Panihi has a tropical rainforest climate (Af). It has moderate rainfall from June to September and heavy to very heavy rainfall in the remaining months.

References

West Nusa Tenggara
Villages in Indonesia